Reginald Gore (1 August 1913 – 8 December 1996) was an English professional footballer who played as a forward.

Career
Born in Clay Cross, Gore played for his local colliery club before being signed as a professional by Chesterfield but never made a first team appearance for the club. He next moved to Birmingham where he again failed to make a first team appearance before transferring to Southport, where he made his Football League debut. He then fell back into non-league football before impressing whilst at Midland League club Frickley Colliery in an exhibition game against West Ham and was signed by the London club where he again played in the Football League. During the war he made guest appearances for West Ham and St Mirren for who he later signed professionally following the war.

Cricket
Gore also played cricket alongside his professional football career, playing for Clay Cross and Ferguslie.

References

External links
Official Frickley Athletic museum and hall of fame website

1913 births
1997 deaths
People from Clay Cross
Footballers from Derbyshire
English footballers
Association football forwards
Chesterfield F.C. players
Birmingham City F.C. players
Southport F.C. players
South Liverpool F.C. players
Rhyl F.C. players
Frickley Athletic F.C. players
West Ham United F.C. players
St Mirren F.C. players
Cowdenbeath F.C. players
English Football League players
Scottish Football League players